Events in the year 1990 in the Republic of India.

Incumbents
 President of India – R. Venkataraman
 Prime Minister of India – V. P. Singh until 10 November, Chandra Shekhar Singh
 Chief Justice of India – Raghunandan Swarup Pathak until 25 September, Ranganath Misra

Governors
 Andhra Pradesh – Kumud Ben Joshi (until 7 February), Krishan Kant (starting 7 February)
 Arunachal Pradesh –
 until 16 March: R. D. Pradhan
 16 March-8 May: Raja Gopal Singh
 starting 8 May: Devi Das Thakur
 Assam – Anisetti Raghuvir (until 2 May), Devi Das Thakur (starting 2 May)
 Bihar – 
 until 2 February: Jagannath Pahadia 
 2 February-16 February: G.G. Sohoni 
 starting 16 February: Mohammad Saleem
 Goa – Khurshed Alam Khan 
 Gujarat – 
 until 2 May: Ram Krishna Trivedi 
 2 May-21 December: Mahipal Shastri
 starting 21 December: Sarup Singh
 Haryana – Hari Anand Barari (until 6 February), Dhanik Lal Mandal (starting 6 February)
 Himachal Pradesh – 
 until 12 January: R. K. S. Ghandhi 
 16 February-20 December: B. Rachaiah
 starting 20 December: Virendra Verma
 Jammu and Kashmir – 
 until 19 January: K. V. Krishna Rao 
 19 January-26 May: Jagmohan Malhotra 
 starting 26 May: Girish Chandra Saxena
 Karnataka – Pendekanti Venkatasubbaiah (until 5 February), Bhanu Pratap Singh (starting 5 February)
 Kerala – 
 until 12 February: Ram Dulari Sinha 
 12 February-20 December: Sarup Singh
 starting 20 December: B. Rachaiah
 Madhya Pradesh – Sarla Grewal (until 5 February), M. A. Khan (starting 6 February)
 Maharashtra – Ram Dulari Sinha (until 18 January), C. Subramaniam (starting 15 February)
 Manipur – Chintamani Panigrahi 
 Meghalaya – A. A. Rahim (until 8 May), Madhukar Dighe (starting 8 May)
 Mizoram – W. A. Sangma (until 7 February), Swaraj Kaushal (starting 8 February)
 Nagaland – Gopal Singh (until 3 May), M. M. Thomas (starting 3 May)
 Odisha – Saiyid Nurul Hasan (until 6 February), Yagya Dutt Sharma (starting 7 February)
 Punjab – 
 until 14 June: Nirmal Kumar Mukherjee 
 14 June-18 December: Virendra Verma
 starting 18 December: Om Prakash Malhotra
 Rajasthan – 
 until 3 February: Sukhdev Prasad
 3 February-14 February: Milap Chand Jain
 starting 14 February: Debi Prasad Chattopadhyaya
 Sikkim – S.K. Bhatnagar (until 7 February), Radhakrishna Hariram Tahiliani (starting 7 February)
 Tamil Nadu – P. C. Alexander (until 23 May), Surjit Singh Barnala (starting 23 May)
 Tripura – Sultan Singh (until 11 February), K. V. Raghunatha Reddy (starting 12 February)
 Uttar Pradesh – Mohammed Usman Arif (until 11 February), B. Satya Narayan Reddy (starting 12 February)
 West Bengal – T. V. Rajeswar (until 7 February), Saiyid Nurul Hasan (starting 7 February)

Events
 National income - 5,761,092 million
 19 January – An insurgency breaks out in Kashmir Valley which leads to Exodus of Kashmiri Hindus, inflaming tensions with Pakistan. New Delhi dissolves the state assembly and imposes direct rule.
 March – The last Indian troops are withdrawn from Sri Lanka.
 15 April – Food poisoning kills 450 guests at an engagement party in Uttar Pradesh.
 15 May – Agriculture and Rural Debt Relief Scheme providing debt relief up to  10,000 to small borrowers from Public Sector Banks and Regional Rural Banks announced.
 4–10 May – Andhra Pradesh cyclone ravages southern India, killing nearly 1,000 people.
 30 May - Communists brutally raped and killed two  workers of UNICEF at Bantala, West Bengal for whistle blowing against corruption. 
 August- V P Singh announces implementation of Mandal commission report.
 19 September - Rajiv Goswami, a commerce student in Deshbandhu College attempted Self-immolation as part of Mandal Commission protests of 1990.
 November – V.P. Singh resigns as prime minister and is succeeded by Janata Dal dissident Chandra Shekhar.
 22 December – Venkitaramanan becomes Governor of RBI

Law

Births
1 January – Ali Murtaza, cricketer.
10 January – Aishwarya Rajesh, actress.
5 February – Bhuvneshwar Kumar, cricketer.
9 March - Arif Khan, Alpine skier.
10 March – Ritu Varma, Actress.
17 March – Saina Nehwal, Indian badminton player.
17 April – Beno Zephine,  first 100% visually challenged officer in the Indian Foreign Service.
20 April – Merin Joseph, Indian Police Service officer.
19 May – Siddarth Kaul, cricketer.
23 July – Yuzvendra Chahal, cricketer.
27 July  Kriti Sanon, Bollywood actress.
3 September – Mohammed Shami, cricketer.
6 September – Aishwarya Lekshmi, actress.
14 September – Suryakumar Yadav, cricketer.
10 October – Rakul Preet Singh, Actress.
13 October – Pooja Hegde, Actress.
16 October – Anirudh Ravichander, music composer and singer.
30 November – Rashi Khanna, Actress.
13 December – Regina Cassandra, actress and model.

Deaths
14 January – Mani Madhava Chakyar, master Chakyar Koothu and Koodiyattam artist (b. 1899).
19 January – Rajneesh, aka OSHO mystic, guru and spiritual leader (b. 11 December 1931)
29 March – Adoor Bhasi, actor, writer, journalist, singer and film producer (b. 1927).
30 April - Angami Zapu Phizo, Naga separatist leader (b. 1913)
1 June - Maharaj Charan Singh, Fourth Satguru of Radha Soami Satsang Beas (born 1916).
7 July - Laldenga, Mizo Nationalist leader. (b. 1927)
30 September – Shankar Nag, actor and director (b. 1954).
21 October – Prabhat Ranjan Sarkar, philosopher, author, social revolutionary, poet, composer and linguist (b. 1921).
30 October – Vinod Mehra, actor (b. 1945).
25 December – Chandrakant T. Patel, cotton scientist (b. 1917).

See also 
 Bollywood films of 1990

References 

 
India
Years of the 20th century in India